The Karnataka Legislative Council, formerly the Mysore Legislative Council, is the upper house of the bicameral legislature of the southern Indian state of Karnataka. Karnataka is one of the six states in India, where the state legislature is bicameral, comprising two houses: a legislative assembly and a legislative council. The Karnataka Legislative Council is a permanent body comprising 75 members.

History
Mysore Legislative Council was established in 1907 by Maharaja Krishnaraja Wadiyar IV (under Regulation I of 1907) which resulted in a bicameral legislature in the kingdom.

Originally, the government of Mysore comprised the dewan and the unicameral Mysore Representative Assembly (constituted in 1881 by Maharaja Chamaraja Wadiyar X). With a view to creating a body composed of a certain number of non-official persons with practical experience and knowledge of local conditions and requirements to assist government in making laws and regulations, the Mysore Legislative Council was established. In addition to the dewan, the president and the members of the Council, who were ex-officio members, the Council at that time consisted of not less than 10 and not more than 15 additional members to be nominated by the government and approved by the Maharaja, out of which not less than two-fifths were required to be non-officials. The minimum and maximum number of additional members was increased from 15 to 21 respectively by Regulation I of 1914 and the maximum was further increased to 30 by Regulation II of 1919.

In 1923, under the Mysore Legislative Council Regulation, (Regulation XIX of 1923), the strength of the Council was fixed at 50. Of the 50 seats, 28 were allotted to the nominated members (official 20 and non-official 8) and 22 to elected members. In 1914, the Council was empowered to discuss state budget, and in 1923 it was given power to vote on the demands for grants. From 1919 onwards, resolutions were discussed in the Council. The term of the Council was three years in 1917 and four years in 1940.

After the implementation of the 1956 States Reorganisation Act, the strength of the Legislative Council of the re-organized Mysore State was increased to 63 under the Legislative Councils Act of 1957 and remained as such until 1987. The council was renamed following the renaming of Mysore State as Karnataka in 1973. Following adoption of a resolution in Karnataka Legislative Assembly on 18 August 1986 and subsequent approval by the Parliament of India, the strength of Legislative Council was increased to 75 with effect from 8 September 1987.

Term
The Karnataka Legislative Council is a permanent body with one-third of its members retiring every two years. The term of members is 6 years (renewable).

Constituencies and Members (75)
At present, among the 75 members of the Legislative Council, 25 are elected by local authorities, 25 are elected by the Karnataka Legislative Assembly members, 7 are elected by the Graduates, 7 are elected by the Teachers and 11 members are nominated by the Governor of Karnataka. The following is the list of the current members:

Elected from Local Authorities' constituencies (25) 
Keys:

Elected by the Legislative Assembly members (25)
Keys:

Elected from Graduates constituencies (7)
Keys:

Elected from Teachers' constituencies (7)
Keys:

Governor Nominated (11)

Keys:

See also
 List of members of the Karnataka Legislative Council, current and past
 List of chairmen of the Karnataka Legislative Council
 List of deputy chairmen of the Karnataka Legislative Council
 TA/DA scam
 Karnataka Legislative Assembly

Notes

External links
 Karnataka Legislative Council official website

 
Karnataka-related lists
1907 establishments in India